Rudi Spring (born 17 March 1962) is a German composer of classical music, pianist and academic. He is known for vocal compositions on texts by poets and his own, and for chamber music such as his three Chamber Symphonies.

Career 

Born in Lindau, Rudi Spring received piano instructions from Alfred Kuppelmayer (1918–1977), starting in 1971. He studied chamber music in 1978 in Bregenz with Heinrich Schiff, with whom he also played in concert. He studied at the Musikhochschule München from 1981 to 1986 composition with Wilhelm Killmayer and Heinz Winbeck, and piano with Karl-Hermann Mrongovius.

He composed songs and song cycles, inspired by poems of Heinrich Heine, Hermann Lenz, including Galgenliederbuch (after Christian Morgenstern, four volumes), Nero lässt grüßen (song cycle after Martin Walser's monodram), So nah in der Ferne (song cycle after poems of Wolfgang Bächler), Liederfolge für mittlere Singstimme und Klavier after poems of August Stramm, Else Lasker-Schüler, Ingeborg Bachmann and Jakob van Hoddis. Several of them were recorded by the Bayerischer Rundfunk, with singers such as Martina Koppelstetter.

Since 1987 he has been teaching several subjects at the Musikhochschule, first vocal coaching then ear training, musical analysis and pitch space, since 1999 Lied interpretation.

Spring received commissions of the state of Baden-Württemberg, the Deutscher Musikrat (German Music Council, a member of the International Music Council), the Münchener Kammerorchester, the Munich Puppet Players, the International Bodensee Festival and the Hugo-Wolf-Akademie Stuttgart, among others.

Together with composer Michael Neunteufel (born 1958), he was interviewed by Alfred Solder (born 1949) of the ORF, broadcast on 16 October 1987, entitled Musik hören, Musik verstehen (Listen to music, understand music). The premiere of Canto sopra un’ idea frattale in 2005 in Vienna was documented in a film Die Kochsche Schneeflocke, directed by Norbert Wartig (born 1973), produced by LNW Film.

In 2005, Spring was awarded the fellowship of the Villa Massimo in Rome.

In 2008 two of his songs appeared on a CD of Salome Kammer, together with music of Cole Porter, Luciano Berio, and Alban Berg, among others. In 2009 he accompanied Salome Kammer at the Rheingau Musik Festival in songs and Chansons of the 1920s to 1940s. He played the piano in a trio concert at the Gasteig, with Jens Josef (flute) and Graham Waterhouse (cello), performing Martinů's trio and the premiere of the flute version of Gestural Variations; every composer contributed a Christmas carol, with Spring setting Maria durch ein Dornwald ging.

Awards 
 1987 Feldkircher Kulturpreis
 1988 Bayerischer Staatlicher Förderpreis für junge Künstler
 2002 Internationaler Bodenseekulturpreis
 2005 Villa Massimo

Selected works

Stage 
Er trieb einen kleinen Finsternishandel op. 71 (1999), for speaker, Klangfiguren (half puppet, half instrument), accordion and violoncello, libretto on aphorisms of Georg Christoph Lichtenberg, premiere 10 June 1999 in Schloss Seefeld, Munich Puppet Players, Maria Reiter, Heinrich Klug
Zwischen Blick hinter Grund op. 74e,1 (2000), text: Rudi Spring, premiere 1 April 2001 in Saulgau, Salome Kammer, Rudi Spring, recorded in 2002 by SFB Berlin
An der steilen, roten Felswand op. 74e,2 (2002), text: Rudi Spring, premiere 2 May 2002 in Benediktbeuern, Salome Kammer, Rudi Spring (piano and speaking voice)
Die Donau und ihr Geist op. 78 (2002), fairy tale melodram for speaker, pantomimes and sextet (clarinet, Tenorhackbrett, accordion, celesta/piano, violin and double bass), libretto: Andrea Haupt and Elisabeth Verhoeven (after the book of Dorothea Rein), premiere 10 November 2002 in Stuttgart, Elisabeth Verhoeven, theatre group of the Musikschule Stuttgart, direction: Andrea Haupt

Vocal 
for voice and one to six instruments
Galgenliederbuch op. 19, (1983–2000) for voice and piano, after Galgenlieder (1895–1905) of Christian Morgenstern
Abend der Kindheit op. 20a (1983) for soprano and quintet (clarinet, horn, harp, violin and violoncello), text: Hermann Lenz, premiere 1983 at the Musikhochschule München
So nah in der Ferne op. 52 (1984–91), song cycle for soprano (or mezzo-soprano) and trio: flute, viola and violoncello, texts: Wolfgang Bächler. premiere 13. November 1992 in Augsburg, Adelheid Maria Thanner, Bettina Fuchs, Gunter Pretzel, Anja Lechner, recorded in 1992 by BR
Liederfolge op. 54 (1992/97) for voice and piano, premiere nos 1, 2, 3, 5, 7 in Weilburg, 27 July 1995, Dietrich Henschel, Fritz Schwinghammer, recorded in 1998 in Brussels, premiere nos 4 and 6 in Prien am Chiemsee, 25 October 1998, Martina Koppelstetter, Rudi Spring, recorded in 1999 by BR
Ach sender schenke op. 55 (1992/93), prelude, song cycle and dance, for baritone and quintet (clarinet/Bassett horn, percussion, Tenorhackbrett, viola and violoncello, texts: Ulrich von Winterstetten, premiere 11 June 1993 in Schloss Achberg, Anselm Richter, Wolfgang Meyer, Stefan Hüge, Marianne Kirch, Hariolf Schlichtig, Manuel Fischer-Dieskau
Incontro op. 79 (2003), canzone in dialogue for baritone and piano (or Hammerflügel). text: Francesco Petrarca, premiere 30 May 2004 in Biedenkopf, Eckelshausener Musiktage, Martin Bruns, Jan Philip Schulze

for voice and ensemble/orchestra
Entzündet op. 70e (2001) for Chanson baritone, accordion and string orchestra, text: Konstantin Wecker, premiere 24 June 2001 in München, Gasteig, Konstantin Wecker, Maria Reiter, Abonnentenorchester of the Münchner Philharmoniker, conductor Heinrich Klug
Heimkunft (Chamber Symphony No. 3) op.74 (2000/01) for mezzo-soprano (or contralto), flute, clarinet, trumpet, accordion, harp and string orchestra, text: Friedrich Hölderlin, Heimkunft. An die Verwandten (1801–04), premiere 19 May 2001 in Tettnang, Neues Schloss, Christa Mayer

for voices a cappella
Von guten Mächten wunderbar geborgen op. 45 (1983–1988) for five-part mixed choir, text: "Von guten Mächten wunderbar geborgen" by Dietrich Bonhoeffer (19 December 1944), premiere 8 June 1991 in Minich, Studienchor of the Musikhochschule München, conductor Max Frey
Narcissus und Echo op. 59 (1994), vocal scene for six-part mixed choir, texts from Ovid's Metamorphoses, premiere 6 August 1994 in Irsee Abbey, conductor Kurt Suttner

Instrumental 
for one to four players
Sonatine (op. 1; 1979) for violoncello and piano, recorded 1980 by the (ORF in Linz, Heinrich Schiff, Rudi Spring
Quartett (op. 47; 1989) for two flutes, Naturton-Hackbrett and piano
Canto sopra un’ idea frattale (op. 81e; 2005) for bassoon and organ, premiere 28 April 2005 in Vienna, Radio-Kulturhaus of the ORF
Risonanze (op. 82b; 2005) for flute, premiere 6 July 2005 in Rome, Villino of the Villa Massimo, Roberto Fabbriciani [born 1949])

or five to eight players
Praeludien (op. 37; 1986/87) for string sextet and Klavier, premiere 12 May 1992 in Schwaz, Wiener Streichsextett, Rudi Spring [Klavier]), recorded in 1992 by ORF in Innsbruck

for ensemble/orchestra
Szene 1 (op. 10; 1981, revised 1987) for violoncello and orchestra, premiere 28 November 1981 in Prague, Heinrich Schiff, Prager Symphoniker, conductor Jiří Bělohlávek [born 1946]
Chamber Symphony No. 1 (op. 63; 1995) for 12 brass players, premiere 6 June 1995 in Berlin
Chamber Symphony No. 2 (op. 68; 1997) for clarinet/tenor saxophon, horn, percussion, accordion and string orchestra, premiere 12 February 1998 in the Herkulessaal of the Munich Residenz, Münchener Kammerorchester, conductor: Jobst Liebrecht

References

External links
Rudi Spring at Hochschule für Musik und Theater München (in German)
Rudi Spring at the Leopold-Mozart-Zentrum of the Augsburg University (in German)
Rudi Spring at Schott
Auf eine existentielle Musik hin Interview by Christoph Schlüren, musikmph.de, 1998 (in German)
Federleichte Pointen, verschollene Lieder – der Komponist und Pianist Rudi Spring Michael Herrschel in neue musik zeitung, 2009 (in German)
Works list (1979–2008) (PDF, 496 kB)
Entries for Rudi Spring on WorldCat

German classical composers
German classical pianists
Male classical pianists
20th-century classical composers
21st-century classical composers
University of Music and Performing Arts Munich alumni
Academic staff of the University of Music and Performing Arts Munich
Composers for piano
1962 births
Living people
People from Lindau
German male classical composers
20th-century German composers
21st-century German composers
German pianists
German male pianists
21st-century classical pianists
20th-century German male musicians
21st-century German male musicians